Canchy is a commune in the Somme department in Hauts-de-France in northern France.

There was a station on the Réseau des Bains de Mer which opened on 19 June 1892 and closed on 10 March 1947.

Geography

Population

See also
Communes of the Somme department
André Abbal

References

Communes of Somme (department)